Khpyuk (Aghul: Хуьпуькь) is a rural locality (a selo) in Kurakhsky District, Republic of Dagestan, Russia. The population was 361 as of 2010. There are 3 streets.

Geography 
Khpyuk is located 17 km northwest of Kurakh (the district's administrative centre) by road. Shimikhyur and Ashar are the nearest rural localities.

Nationalities 
Aghul people live there.

References 

Rural localities in Kurakhsky District